Davide Labate (born 18 April 1972) is an Italian journalist from 1993 and alpine skiing commentator, broadcasting for Rai Sport from 2009.

Biography
A native of Messina, in the summer he returns to his Torre Faro, a seaside village near the Ganzirri Lake. In 2013 some members of the Italian national ski team, in Sicily for a dry training period in the summer, were guests at his home, among these Manfred Moelgg, Florian Eisath, Roberto Nani, Luca De Aliprandini, Dominik Paris, Werner Heel, Silvano Varettoni and Mattia Casse.

Career
Voice RAI of the men's Alpine Ski World Cup, from the 2009-2010 season, up to the 2018-2019 season, he was joined by the former valanga azzurra skier Paolo De Chiesa. Starting from the 2019-2020 season, De Chiesa has been replaced by the former skier Max Blardone.

References

External links
 Davide Labate at Calcio RAI

1972 births
Living people
Italian male journalists
Italian sports journalists
Italian sports commentators
Skiing announcers
People from Messina